Acreichthys tomentosus, commonly known as the bristle-tail filefish, is a species of demersal marine fish which belongs to the family Monacanthidae and is widespread throughout the tropical waters of the Indo-west Pacific. It is a small fish that can reach a maximum size of 12 cm length and has the ability to rapidly change color and skin texture and patterns as to avoid detection and consequently predation. It is oviparous

Description 
On average, it ranges from 3.8 to 8.9 centimeters (1.5-3.5 inches) in length. It has 27-30 anal spines and 26-29 anal soft rays.

Distribution and Ecology 
It is found in the waters around Sri Lanka, Ishigaki island, the Philippines, Indonesia, New Guinea, Queensland, New Caledonia, and Tonga. It inhabits shallow coral reefs, preferring sections of the reef which contain seagrass. It prefers temperatures of 27.6-29 degrees Celsius (81.7-84.2 degrees Fahrenheit), a dissolved oxygen concentration of 4.51-4.59 mL/L (4510-4590 ppm), and a depth of 2–15 meters (6.6-49.2 feet).

Diet 
It feeds on amphipods, polychaetes, and mollusks.

References

External links
http://www.marinespecies.org/aphia.php?p=taxdetails&id=220054
http://www.fishbase.org/summary/7849
 

Monacanthidae
Fish described in 1758
Taxa named by Carl Linnaeus